Dirichlet's theorem may refer to any of several mathematical theorems due to Peter Gustav Lejeune Dirichlet.

Dirichlet's theorem on arithmetic progressions
Dirichlet's approximation theorem
Dirichlet's unit theorem
Dirichlet conditions
Dirichlet boundary condition
Dirichlet's principle
Pigeonhole principle, sometimes also called Dirichlet's principle
Dirichlet's test for convergence

Mathematics disambiguation pages